Cyril William Edwards (8 August 1947 – 15 July 2019)  was a British medievalist and translator. Teaching in London and Oxford, he published extensively on the medieval German lyric and Old High German literature, and translated four of the major Middle High German verse narratives.

Life
Cyril Edwards was born in Neston, Cheshire, the son of William Henry Edwards, a gardener at the University of Liverpool’s Ness Botanic Gardens in the Wirral, and Edith Mary Edwards (née Purchase).
From Calday Grange Grammar School he went up to Oxford, graduating in 1970 with a degree in German from Jesus College. He went on to do research, completing a doctoral thesis on Konrad von Würzburg under Ruth Harvey in 1975.

In 1976 he took up a Lectureship in German at Goldsmiths College, University of London, where he taught Medieval German Literature and History of the German Language.
At Goldsmiths he was responsible for organizing three conferences  devoted to Interdisciplinary Medieval Studies, which brought together historians, literary scholars and linguists.

He published over 30 journal articles and book chapters, with a particular focus on Minnesang and the Arthurian Romance. A number of his papers on Old High German literature were collected in the volume The Beginnings of German Literature: comparative and interdisciplinary approaches to Old High German.

A characteristic feature of his scholarship was a concern with examining the original manuscripts of medieval texts, which led to visits to a wide range of libraries and archives in continental Europe. On a research trip to the Benedictine abbey of Kremsmünster in Upper Austria, he identified a previously unrecognized manuscript page (Cod. 248) in the abbey's library as a song by the Minnesänger Heinrich von Morungen. This led to a series of publications on Morungen's songs, culminating in an edited volume devoted to the "Narcissus song" (MF 145,1). (At his death Edwards was preparing an edition and translation of a late 15th century housebook (Cod. 264) held by the Kremsmünster Abbey.)

In 1994, "despite his record of committed and successful teaching and his internationally recognised distinction in research", Goldsmiths made him redundant on "thematic grounds", a move which gave rise to protests from colleagues in the UK and overseas.

Relocating to Abingdon in 1995, he became a lecturer in German at St Peter's College and Senior Research Fellow of the university's Faculty of Medieval and Modern Languages. In the following years he published translations of four of the great narrative poems of the Middle High German classical period: Wolfram von Eschenbach's Parzival, the Nibelungenlied and Hartmann von Aue's two Arthurian romances, Erec and Iwein. Both the Parzival and the Nibelungenlied translations were published in the Oxford World's Classics series.

His interests and expertise went beyond the medieval: at Oxford he also taught German Cinema, and he contributed the article on Theodor Fontane to the Dictionary of National Biography. His later publications include two cook books and a book of poems. He was also a tiddlywinks player of some standing, representing both Oxford University and England, and at one point ranked 11th in the world.

Cyril Edwards died of a heart attack, aged 71, on 15 July 2019 in Abingdon. Professor Nigel Palmer wrote, "Cyril was a remarkable figure, a lovable eccentric, a fine scholar with a wide range of cultural interests who had a difficult career. His translations have played an important part in keeping interest in medieval German literature alive in the English-speaking world."

Publications

Medieval literature
Books

 

Selected articles

Translations
Middle High German literature
 
Paperback: 

 

Modern works

Other works

Further reading

References

1947 births
2019 deaths
People from Neston
People educated at Calday Grange Grammar School
Alumni of Jesus College, Oxford
Academics of Goldsmiths, University of London
Academics of the University of Oxford
British medievalists
Germanists
German–English translators
20th-century British translators
21st-century British translators